The National Union of Glovers and Leatherworkers (NUGLW) was a trade union in the United Kingdom which existed between 1920 and 1971. It represented workers in the glove-making and leather industry.

History

The union was formed in 1920 by the merger of the Amalgamated Society of Glovers and the United Glovers' Mutual Aid Society as the National Union of Glovers (NUG). The union was based primarily in Yeovil and the surrounding areas, a major centre for the glove-making industry in Britain. In 1919 the NUG rejected a proposal from the National Union of Boot and Shoe Operatives (NUBSO) to amalgamate, on the basis that the NUG's status as the majority union on the Glove Manufacturing Joint Industrial Council (JIC) gave it a strong bargaining position with employers. In 1954 the union changed its name to include workers in the leather industry. In 1971 the NUGLW  merged with the Amalgamated Society of Leather Workers, NUBSO and the National Union of Leather Workers and Allied Trades to form the National Union of Footwear, Leather and Allied Trades (NUFLAT).

General Secretaries
1920: A. H. J. Stroud
1945: E. C. G. Fear

References

External links
Catalogue of the NUGLW archives, held at the Modern Records Centre, University of Warwick

Defunct trade unions of the United Kingdom
Trade unions established in 1920
Trade unions disestablished in 1971
Textile and clothing trade unions
1920 establishments in the United Kingdom
Leather industry trade unions
Trade unions based in Somerset